Grievous Bodily Harm is a 1988 Australian crime film directed by Mark Joffe starring Colin Friels and John Waters.

Plot
Crime reporter Tom Stewart (Colin Friels) and a cop (Bruno Lawrence) look for a deranged schoolteacher (John Waters) who goes on a murder spree while looking for the lover he thought to be dead.

Cast
John Waters as Morris Martin
Colin Friels as Tom Stewart
Bruno Lawrence as Det. Sgt. Ray Birch
Kim Gyngell as Mick
Gary Stalker as Derek Allen
Joy Bell as Claudine
Shane Briant as Stephen Enderby
Caz Lederman as Vivian Enderby
John Flaus as Neil Bradshaw

Production
The script was written by Warwick Hind, a former executive at Greater Union. Errol Sullivan showed the script to Richard Brennan, who raised up to around a $1 million of the budget; the remainder was raised through Antony I. Ginnane. Richard Brennan says the actual cost of the film was $3 million but various fees put it up to $3.4 million.

Awards
The film was nominated for 4 AFI Awards in 1988, including best picture.

Box office
Grievous Bodily Harm grossed $82,267 at the box office in Australia. However it did sell to American company Fries Entertainment for over $1 million.

See also
Cinema of Australia

References

Further reading

External links

Grievous Bodily Harm at the Australian screen
Grievous Bodily Harm at Oz Movies

1988 films
Australian crime drama films
1980s crime films
Films directed by Mark Joffe
Films scored by Chris Neal (songwriter)
1980s English-language films
1980s Australian films